Nicholas Caley (born January 22, 1983) is an American football coach who is the tight ends coach for the Los Angeles Rams of the National Football League (NFL). He began coaching in the NFL after 10 years of coaching at the collegiate level.

Coaching career

New England Patriots
Nick coached at the collegiate level for 10 years before becoming part of the Patriots' staff in 2015. In 2017 Nick was promoted and became the tight ends coach for the Patriots. On February 5, 2017, Caley was part of the Patriots coaching staff that won Super Bowl LI. In the game, the Patriots defeated the Atlanta Falcons by a score of 34–28 in overtime. Caley was promoted to tight ends coach, during which time he coached Rob Gronkowski to Pro Bowl and All-Pro honors in 2017 New England Patriots season, when the Patriots won their second straight AFC Championship before narrowly losing in Super Bowl LII to the Philadelphia Eagles. A year later, New England defeated the Los Angeles Rams in Super Bowl LIII. In 2020 Nick added on the title of being the teams fullbacks coach in addition to retaining his position as tight ends coach. In 2022, Caley reverted to only coaching the tight ends for the Patriots.

Los Angeles Rams
On February 5, 2023, Caley was hired as a tight ends coach by the Los Angeles Rams.

Family
Nick and his wife Grace have two daughters, Caroline and Vivian.

References

External links 
 Florida Atlantic Owls bio
 New England Patriots bio

1983 births
Living people
Akron Zips football coaches
Arkansas Razorbacks football coaches
Auburn Tigers football coaches
Eastern Illinois Panthers football coaches
Florida Atlantic Owls football coaches
Iowa State Cyclones football coaches
John Carroll Blue Streaks football players
John Carroll Blue Streaks football coaches
Los Angeles Rams coaches
New England Patriots coaches
Players of American football from Canton, Ohio
Sportspeople from Canton, Ohio